Into the Eagle's Nest is a video game developed by Pandora  and published for Amiga, Amstrad CPC, Apple II, Atari 8-bit family, Atari ST, Commodore 64, IBM PC, and ZX Spectrum starting in 1987.

Plot
The player character is an Allied soldier whose orders are to infiltrate the top-secret Nazi fortress called the Eagle's Nest (which consists of four castles), rescue three Allied saboteurs being held there, save art treasures the Nazis have stolen, and then destroy the Nest with explosives.

Gameplay
A joystick is required for control, and the player depresses the firing button to fire the machine gun, which carries enough ammunition for 99 shots. Nazis require two well-placed shots to eliminate, and Nazis sitting at a table only require one well-placed shot. The player can sustain up to 50 shots from enemy soldiers.  While inside the castles, the player finds crates which may contain art objects or explosives. The player can also find ammunition dumps, first-aid kits, and goods in the castles.

Release
The game was originally programmed by Andrew Challis for the Commodore 64, and by Kevin Parker for the Amiga, Amstrad CPC, Atari ST and ZX Spectrum platforms, with graphics provided by Robin Chapman for all formats. It was initially released in 1987 by Pandora in the United Kingdom. The game was also licensed by Mindscape for release in the United States, who handled the Apple II port by Andrew Pines and IBM PC port by Visionware Inc.

In 1988 Atari Corporation published a cartridge version for the Atari 8-bit family as part of the Atari XEGS release line-up.

Reception
Compute! called Into the Eagle's Nest "a good, solid arcade game" but criticized it for not allowing save games during most of the game, and stated that receiving points for killing drunken, unconscious Nazi soldiers seemed like "cold-blooded murder". The game was reviewed in 1987 in Dragon #128 by Hartley, Patricia, and Kirk Lesser in "The Role of Computers" column. The reviewers game the game 4 out of 5 stars.

Tracie Forman Hines reviewed the game for Computer Gaming World, and stated that "Into the Eagle's Nest was some of the best fun this jaded critic has had in ages and it is a game that most people will go back to time after time. Strategic shootout fans will find this one a blast."

A 1991 Computer Gaming World survey of strategy and war games gave it two and a half stars out of five, stating that it was "fun for a short time, but rapidly loses its interest appeal".

Reviews
Crash! - May, 1989
ACE (Advanced Computer Entertainment) - Feb, 1988
The Games Machine - Oct, 1987
ACE (Advanced Computer Entertainment) - Oct, 1988
Tilt - Jun, 1987
Computer Gaming World - Nov, 1991
ASM (Aktueller Software Markt) - Sep, 1987

References

External links

Into the Eagle's Nest for the Atari ST at Atari Mania
Into the Eagle's Nest for the Atari 8-bit family at Atari Mania
Into the Eagle's Nest at Lemon Amiga
Into the Eagle's Nest at Spectrum Computing
Review in ANALOG Computing
Review in Info
Review in Info

1987 video games
Amiga games
Amstrad CPC games
Apple II games
Atari 8-bit family games
Atari ST games
Commodore 64 games
DOS games
Mindscape games
Video games about Nazi Germany
Video games developed in the United Kingdom
World War II video games
ZX Spectrum games